The 1999–2000 season was the Persepolis's 9th season in the Azadegan League, and their 17th consecutive season in the top division of Iranian Football. They were also be competing in the Hazfi Cup and Asian Club Championship. Persepolis was captained by Hossein Abdi.

Squad

Mid-season Transfers

In

Technical staff

|}

Competitions

Overview

Azadegan League

Standings

Matches

Hazfi Cup 

Round of 32

 Persepolis withdrew after this round.

Asian Club Championship

Second round

Quarterfinals

West Asia

Semifinals

Third place match

Scorers

Goalkeeping

References

Persepolis F.C. seasons
Persepolis